Donna Pope (born October 15, 1931 in Cleveland, Ohio) is an American politician and civil servant who served as the Director of the United States Mint, appointed by President Ronald Reagan.

Career 
Prior to being appointed Director, she served as a member of the Ohio House of Representatives. During her time as the Director of the United States Mint, she oversaw the establishment of gold coins, which were the first since 1933. After leaving the United States Mint in 1991, she served as the Director of U.S. Market Activities for the International Olympic Committee's centennial coin program.

References

External links
Profile on the Ohio Ladies' Gallery website

1931 births
Republican Party members of the Ohio House of Representatives
Women state legislators in Ohio
Directors of the United States Mint
Living people
Reagan administration personnel
George H. W. Bush administration personnel